Silverline was a contemporary Christian music band from Brainerd, Minnesota. They were on the Dream Records label and broke up in 2015.

Background 

Silverline is from Brainerd, Minnesota, and formed in 2006.

Music

EPs 

The band released two independent EPs called Silverline in 2007 and EP in 2008, and they released two with VSR Music Group. The first was called "Start to Believe" and produced their breakout single "Get It Right". The second EP, titled "Voices in the Night", was even more successful and charted at No. 73 on the Christian & Gospel Albums chart by Billboard. From the EP Voices in the Night, the band had two songs chart on the Christian Rock charts, which were "Broken Glass" and "Shine a Light", which charted at No. 1.

Lights Out 

Their first full-length studio album was released on April 9, 2013. Lights Out, which was with Dream Records, and was produced by Ben Kasica charted at No. 34 on the Christian & Gospel Albums Chart and at No. 13 on the Top Heatseekers chart. The first single from the album "Lights Out" has charted at No. 1 on the Christian rock songs chart, for two consecutive weeks on April 20 and 27, 2013.

Discography

Album

EPs

Singles

References

External links 

 

Christian rock groups from Minnesota
Musical groups established in 2006
Musical groups from Minnesota